Lewis J. Powers (January 15, 1837 – September 15, 1915) was an American businessman and  politician who served in both branches of the city council and as the 15th Mayor of Springfield, Massachusetts from 1879 to 1880.

He died in Springfield on September 15, 1915.

Notes

1837 births
1915 deaths
Massachusetts Democrats
Mayors of Springfield, Massachusetts
Businesspeople from Springfield, Massachusetts
19th-century American politicians
Springfield, Massachusetts City Council members
19th-century American businesspeople